Majdan Sobieszczański is a village in the administrative district of Gmina Niedrzwica Duża, within Lublin County, Lublin Voivodeship, in eastern Poland.

Bishop Stanisław Stefanek was born in Majdan Sobieszczański in 1936.

References

Villages in Lublin County